Richard McClure Brown (May 27, 1907 – November 30, 1990) was an American football player. 

Brown was born in 1907 in Waverly, Iowa. He attended Cedar Rapids High School.

He played college football for the Iowa Hawkeyes football team from 1926 to 1928. He was the captain of the 1928 Iowa team. He also played professional football in the National Football League (NFL) as a center for the Portsmouth Spartans in 1930. He appeared in 11 NFL games, eight as a starter.

Brown was married in 1931 to Gladys Beiber.

References

1907 births
1990 deaths
Iowa Hawkeyes football players
Portsmouth Spartans players
Players of American football from Iowa